Wei Theodore "Ted" Huang (born 4 July 1970) is a Taiwanese windsurfer. He competed at the 1996 Summer Olympics and the 2000 Summer Olympics.

References

External links
 

1970 births
Living people
Taiwanese windsurfers
Taiwanese male sailors (sport)
Olympic sailors of Taiwan
Sailors at the 1996 Summer Olympics – Mistral One Design
Sailors at the 2000 Summer Olympics – Mistral One Design
Asian Games silver medalists for Chinese Taipei
Asian Games medalists in sailing
Sailors at the 1998 Asian Games
Medalists at the 1998 Asian Games
Place of birth missing (living people)